The Family Court of the State of New York is a specialized court of the New York State Unified Court System located in each county of the state. The New York City Family Court is the name given to the state Family Court within New York City.

Jurisdiction 
It is a family court that hears cases involving children and families and handles issues such as child abuse and neglect (child protection), adoption, child custody and visitation, domestic violence, guardianship, juvenile delinquency, paternity, persons in need of supervision (PINS), and child support. In New York City, it has concurrent jurisdiction with the New York City Criminal Court for family offenses (domestic violence).

Family Court does not have jurisdiction over divorces, which must be litigated in the Supreme Court, and although Criminal Court domestic violence parts typically hear all cases involving crimes against intimate partners (whether opposite- or same-sex), New York law defines family offenses to include only those related by blood, actual marriage (common law marriage is not recognized in New York), or a child in common.

Judges 
In the New York City Family Court (the "Family Court of the State of New York within the City of New York"), judges are appointed by the Mayor to ten-year terms; elsewhere they are elected to ten-year terms. There are 47 judges in the New York City Family Court.

In 1939, Justice Jane Bolin became the first black female judge in the United States when Mayor Fiorello La Guardia swore her in to the bench of the Family Court, then called the Domestic Relations Court. Her 10-year appointment was renewed by the city's mayors three times until she reached the mandatory retirement age of 70.

History 

The children's court part of the New York City court of special sessions was created in 1915, from a 1902 children's court division of the New York County court of general sessions. Children's courts were authorized throughout the state by constitutional referendum in 1921 followed by statute in 1922. The Children's Court of the City of New York was a state court that opened on September 15, 1924 and was consolidated into the Domestic Relations Court of the City of New York created on October 1, 1933. In 1962 the Family Court replaced these courts after a 1961 constitutional amendment.

Notes

References

External links
 Legal Referral Service (a lawyer referral service) from the New York City Bar Association
 Lawyer Referral and Information Service (a lawyer referral service) from the New York State Bar Association
  New York City Family Court
 Family Court outside New York City
 Uniform Rules for the Family Court in the NYCRR

New York (state) state courts
New York
1962 establishments in New York City
Courts and tribunals established in 1962